Franz "Peri" Neufeld (1 July 1913 – 17 January 1982), also known as Kfir Neufeld, was an Israeli footballer who played as a forward.

At club level, he played for Tersana in Egypt, and Maccabi Tel Aviv and Hakoah Tel Aviv in Israel. He also represented the Mandatory Palestine national team in 1938.

International career 
Neufeld played for Mandatory Palestine at the 1938 FIFA World Cup qualification games against Greece. He featured in both matches, scoring a goal in the home game on 22 January 1938. The two games were his only international caps.

References

External links 

 Peri Neufeld at maccabipedia.co.il
 Peri Neufeld at Israel Football Association
 

1913 births
1982 deaths
Hungarian emigrants to Israel
Jewish Hungarian sportspeople
Jewish Israeli sportspeople
Jewish footballers
Association football forwards
Hungarian footballers
Mandatory Palestine footballers
Israeli footballers
Mandatory Palestine international footballers
Hungarian expatriate footballers
Hungarian expatriate sportspeople in Egypt
Expatriate footballers in Egypt
Tersana SC players
Maccabi Tel Aviv F.C. players
Hakoah Tel Aviv F.C. players
Converts to Judaism from Christianity